The discography of Foo Fighters, an American rock band formed in 1995 by Dave Grohl, consists of ten studio albums, ten extended plays (EPs), six video albums, and 57 singles (including promotional releases). The current Foo Fighters line-up consists, after the death of their drummer Taylor Hawkins, of Grohl (vocals and guitar), Rami Jaffee (keyboard), Nate Mendel (bass), Chris Shiflett (guitar) and Pat Smear (guitar).

In October 1994, Grohl recorded an album's worth of songs in which he played all instruments in Seattle's Robert Lang Studios. He chose the name "Foo Fighters" for the project to hide his identity and passed cassette copies of the sessions to personal friends. After those tapes attracted record label interest, Grohl signed with Capitol Records, who released the results as the album Foo Fighters in 1995. The album peaked at number 23 on the Billboard 200, earning a platinum certification in the United States and having lead single, "This Is a Call" on the top 10 of the UK and Australia. After extensive touring with a full-fledged band—along with Grohl were Mendel, Smear and drummer William Goldsmith—the band went into recording follow-up album The Colour and the Shape, released in 1997. The record charted higher, reaching number 10 on the Billboard 200, and with certifications of Platinum in Australia and Canada and double platinum in the US. The "Everlong" single from the album has been certified 2× Platinum in the US.

Following the tour for The Colour and the Shape, Foo Fighters left Capitol and Grohl decided to build a home studio in Alexandria, Virginia wanting a production away from studio interference, given the troubled recording of the previous album, which led to the departure of Goldsmith and Smear. Along with Mendel and new drummer Hawkins, Grohl recorded Foo Fighters' third album, There Is Nothing Left to Lose, in 1999 and signed a distribution deal with RCA Records, which remains their label as of 2021. The band again got certifications of platinum in the US, Australia and Canada, and had its first single to chart on the US Billboard Hot 100 with "Learn to Fly".

Foo Fighters' fourth album, One by One (2002), marked the first studio foray with Shiflett and was their first to top the charts in the United Kingdom and Australia. The album's tour resulted in the band's first video album, 2003's Everywhere but Home, featuring live concert footage from the One by One tour. Grohl led the construction of a professional studio in Los Angeles in 2004, and the band recorded its next two studio albums there: 2005's In Your Honor, a top five hit in both the UK and Australia and origin of the band's highest-scoring single "Best of You", and 2007's Echoes, Silence, Patience & Grace, which topped the charts in Australia, Belgium, Canada, and the UK and had three songs atop the Billboard Modern Rock Tracks chart. The former's tour of acoustic concerts resulted in the live album Skin and Bones (2006), while the latter tour had two gigs at Wembley Stadium recorded on the DVD Live at Wembley Stadium (2008). The band's first compilation, 2009's Greatest Hits, became their sixth album to surpass 1 million copies sold in the United States.

In 2011, the album Wasting Light was released, recorded at Grohl's home in Los Angeles, and debuting at number one in twelve countries. The album's first single "Rope" holds the record for the most consecutive weeks at number one on the US Rock Songs chart. Their eighth studio album, Sonic Highways, was recorded in eight different American cities and released in 2014. As of 2015 the band's eight studio albums have sold 12 million copies in the US alone. Foo Fighters' ninth album, Concrete and Gold, was released on September 15, 2017 and became the band's second #1 album in the United States.

Medicine at Midnight is the tenth studio album by American rock band Foo Fighters. Originally scheduled for 2020, the album was delayed to February 5, 2021 due to the COVID-19 pandemic.

Albums

Studio albums

Compilation albums

Live albums

Extended plays

Foo Files EPs
Starting in 2019, the band has released their archive of B-sides and live performances in digital EPs called the Foo Files.

Singles

1990s

2000s

2010s

2020s

Promotional singles

Other charted songs

Video albums

Music videos

Other appearances

See also
 Dave Grohl discography
 List of songs recorded by Foo Fighters
 Nirvana discography

Notes

References

External links
 

Discography
Discographies of American artists
Rock music group discographies